Zahedan Stadium is a football stadium in Zahedan, Iran. The stadium opened on April 18, 2008.

Notes

Sports venues completed in 2008
Football venues in Iran
Buildings and structures in Sistan and Baluchestan Province
Stadium
Sport in Sistan and Baluchestan Province